The PSL Player of the Season in South African football is awarded to the most outstanding player. The winner is selected by votes from the premiership coaches.

References

Premier Soccer League trophies and awards